Light Warlpiri is a mixed language of Australia, with indigenous Warlpiri, Kriol, and Standard Australian English as its parent languages. First documented by linguist Carmel O'Shannessy of the University of Michigan, it is spoken in the Warlpiri community of Lajamanu, mostly by people under the age of 40. As of 2013, there were 350 native speakers of Light Warlpiri, although all of the speakers also knew traditional Warlpiri and many speak Kriol and English.

Characteristics
Like other mixed languages, such as Gurindji Kriol, Michif and Medny Aleut, Light Warlpiri takes its nominal and verbal systems from different source languages.  Most nouns are from Warlpiri or English, and take Warlpiri case-marking; but, most verbs and the verbal inflection/auxiliary structure is both borrowed and significantly reanalyzed from Kriol and Australian Aboriginal English.

History
Light Warlpiri appears to have originated in the 1980s as a codification and expansion of the Warlpiri/Kriol/English code-switching patterns used in speech directed to young children. The children processed the input they heard as a single system, and added innovations in the verb complex. Within the community, it is perceived as a variety of Warlpiri.

See also
 Gurindji Kriol

References

Citations

External links
 Light Warlpiri DoReCo corpus compiled by Carmel O'Shannessy. Audio recordings of narrative texts, with transcriptions time-aligned at the phone level and translations.

Ngarrkic languages
English-based pidgins and creoles
Mixed languages
Pidgins and creoles of Australia
1980s in Australia